Thomas Hoccleve or Occleve (1368 or 1369–1426) was an English poet and clerk, who became a key figure in 15th-century Middle English literature. His Regement of Princes or De Regimine Principum is a homily on virtues and vices, written for Henry V of England shortly before his accession.

Biography
Hoccleve was born in 1368, as he states when writing in 1421 (Dialogue, 1.246) that he has seen "fifty wyntir and three". Nothing is known of his family, but they probably came from the village of Hockliffe in Bedfordshire. In November 1420, Hoccleve's fellow Privy Seal clerk John Bailey returned land and tenements in Hockliffe to him, which suggests that Hoccleve may indeed have had family ties there.

What is known of his life comes mainly from his works and from administrative records. He obtained a clerkship in the Office of the Privy Seal at the age of about twenty. This would require him to know both French and Latin. Hoccleve retained the post on and off for about 35 years, despite grumbling. He had hoped for a church benefice, but none came. However, on 12 November 1399 he was granted an annuity by the new king, Henry IV. The Letter to Cupid, the first datable poem of his was a 1402 translation of L'Epistre au Dieu d'Amours of Christine de Pisan, written as a sort of riposte to the moral of Troilus and Criseyde, to some manuscripts of which it is attached. La Male Regle (c. 1406), one of his most fluid and lively works, is a mock-penitential poem that gives some glimpses of dissipation in his youth.

By 1410 he had married "only for love" (Regiment..., 1.1561) and settled down to writing moral and religious poems. He was still married in November 1420 when he and his wife receive bequests in a will. His best-known Regement of Princes or De Regimine Principum, written for Henry V of England shortly before his accession, is a homily on virtues and vices, adapted from Aegidius de Colonna's work of the same name, from a supposed epistle of Aristotle known as Secretum Secretorum, and a work of Jacques de Cessoles (fl. 1300) translated later by Caxton as The Game and Playe of Chesse. The Regement survives in at least 43 manuscript copies. It comments on Henry V's lineage, to cement the House of Lancaster's claim to England's throne. Its incipit is a poem occupying about a third of the whole, containing further reminiscences of London tavern life in a dialogue between the poet and an old man. He also remonstrated with Sir John Oldcastle, a leading Lollard, calling on him to "rise up, a manly knight, out of the slough of heresy."

The Series, which combines autobiographical poetry, poetic translations and prose moralizations of the translated texts, begins with a description of a period of "wylde infirmitee". in which the Hoccleve-character claims he temporarily lost his "wit" and "memorie" (this stands as the earliest autobiographical description of mental illness in English). He describes recovering from this "five years ago last All Saints" (Complaint, 11.55–6) but still experiencing social alienation as a result of gossip about this insanity. The Series continues with "Dialog with a Friend," which claims to be written after his recovery and gives a pathetic picture of a poor poet, now 53, with sight and mind impaired. In it he tells the unnamed friend of his plans to write a tale he owes to his good patron, Humphrey of Gloucester, and of translating a portion of Henry Suso's popular Latin treatise on the art of dying – a task the friend discourages, saying that too much study was the cause of his mental illness. The Series then fulfils this plan, continuing with moralized tales of Jereslaus' Wife and of Jonathas (both from Gesta Romanorum). The Series next turns to Learn to die, a theologically and psychologically astute verse translation of Henry Suso's Latin prose Ars Moriendi (Book II, Chapter 2 of the Horologium Sapientiae). The theme of mortality and strict calendar structure of the Series link the sequence to the death of Hoccleve's friend and Privy Seal colleague John Bailey in November 1420. This is supported by the revised date of the Series – November 1420 to All Saints (1 November) 1421 — bringing forward the date of his mental illness to 1415. Two autograph manuscripts of the Series survive.

In addition to writing his own poetry, Hoccleve seems to have earned also from his Privy Seal clerkship by working as a scribe. He was "Scribe E" on a manuscript of John Gower's Confessio Amantis, which also features "Scribe B", copyist of the Hengwrt Chaucer and Ellesmere Chaucer manuscripts, and the prolific copyist "Scribe D". He also compiled a formulary of over one thousand model Privy Seal documents in French and Latin for the use of other clerks.

On 4 March 1426, the Exchequer rolls record a last reimbursement to Hoccleve (for red wax and ink for office use). He died soon after this. On 8 May 1426 his corrody (allowance for food and clothing) at Southwick Priory in Hampshire was passed to Alice Penfold to be held "in manner and form like Thomas Hoccleve now deceased".

Work
Like his more prolific contemporary John Lydgate, Hoccleve is a key figure in 15th-century English literature. For much of the 20th century his work was little valued, but is now seen as an insight into the literate culture of England under the Lancastrian regime. It represents literature of the time for the 15th century, preserving innovations to vernacular poetics originally made by their "maister" Geoffrey Chaucer, to whom Hoccleve pays warm tribute in three passages in De Regimine Principum. Hoccleve's first work for which a certain date is known is "Letter of Cupid" (1402).
 
The main interest in Hoccleve's poems today is for portraying the character of his time. His hymns to the Virgin, ballades to patrons, complaints to the king and the kings treasurer, versified homilies and moral tales, with warnings to heretics like Oldcastle, illustrate the blight that had fallen on poetry with Chaucer's death, the nearest approach to whose realistic touch occurs in Hoccleve's Male Regle. Compared with Lydgate, these pictures of 15th-century London are graver, as they ruminate on a civil servant's place in an unstable Lancastrian bureaucracy.

Yet Hoccleve claimed to know the limits of his powers. His diction is relatively simple and clear; as a metrist he is self-deprecating. While he confesses that "Fader Chaucer fayn wolde han me taught, But I was dul and learned lite or naught," this pose was conventional in Hoccleve's time, and an inheritance from Chaucer himself, whose alter-ego Geoffrey was portrayed as fat and dimwitted in the "House of Fame" and The Canterbury Tales. Later known as the "humility topos", the posture would become a conventional form of authorial self-presentation in the Renaissance.

The scansion of his verses seems occasionally to call in French fashion for an accent on an unstressed syllable. Yet the seven-line rhyme royal and eight-line stanzas to which he limited himself are perhaps more reminiscent of Chaucer than of Lydgate.

The Oxford English Dictionary cites Hoccleve as the first recorded user of many words, including annuity, causative, flexible, innate, interrupt, manual, miserable, notice, obtain, pitiless, slut and suspense.

A poem, Ad beatam Virginem, generally known as Mother of God and once attributed to Chaucer, is copied among Hoccleve's works in manuscript in Phillipps 8151 (Cheltenham). This may be regarded as his work. Hoccleve found a 17th-century admirer in William Browne, who included his Jonathas in Shepheard's Pipe (1614). Browne added a eulogy of the poet, whose works he intended to publish in their entirety (Works, ed. WC Hazlitt, 1869, ii. f 96-198). In 1796 George Mason printed Six Poems by Thomas Hoccleve never before printed.... De Regimine Principum was printed for the Roxburghe Club in 1860 and by Early English Text Society in 1897. (See Frederick James Furnivall's introduction to Hoccleve's Works; I. The Minor Poems, in the Phillipps manuscript 8131, and the Durham manuscript III. p, Early English Text Society, 1892.)

Hoccleve's handwriting
Hoccleve has left behind more manuscripts and documents in his own hand than any other known medieval English writer. There are four literary manuscripts that are generally considered by scholars to have been solely or mostly in his hand. These are Durham University Library, Cosin MS V. iii. 9 (The Series); London, British Library, MS Harley 219, recently identified by Misty Schieberle (in Hoccleve's hand are extracts from the Gesta Romanorum, some of Odo of Cheriton's Fables, Christine de Pizan's Epistre Othea, and a trilingual glossary of French terms into Latin and/or English); and San Marino, Huntington Library MSS HM 111 and HM 744 (collections of his shorter poems). There also exist two other literary manuscripts with possible additions and/or corrections in Hoccleve's hand. A certain attribution is Scribe E in Cambridge, Trinity College, MS R.3.2, John Gower's Confessio Amantis, ff. 82r–84r, first column; a possible attribution is Hand F in Aberystwyth, National Library of Wales, Peniarth MS 392 D [Hengwrt], Geoffrey Chaucer's Canterbury Tales, ff. 83v, line 24 from fourth term; 138v, lines 25 b–26; and 150r, line 30). Hoccleve also wrote out the majority of the Privy Seal Formulary in the British Library, MS Add. 24,062. His writing stints in the Formulary and those of his Privy Seal colleagues in the Formulary and in BL, Harley MS 219 have been identified by Sebastian Sobecki.

Editions
Furnivall's edition of Hoccleve's complete works, still largely standard for scholars, was reprinted in the 1970s; however, Michael Seymour's Selections from Hoccleve, published by the Clarendon Press (a division of Oxford University Press) in 1981, provides an excellent sampling of the poet's major and minor works for readers seeking a sense of Hoccleve's work. J. A. Burrow's 1999 Early English Text Society  edition of Thomas Hoccleve's Complaint and Dialogue is becoming the standard edition of the two excerpts from the Hoccleve's later works (collectively known as The Series), as is Charles Blyth's TEAMS Middle English Text Series edition of The Regiment of Princes from the same year — particularly for modernised spelling that facilitates use in the classroom. These three recent editions all have introductions offering a thorough sense of a poet hitherto under-appreciated.

Scholarship
Ethan Knapp, The Bureaucratic Muse: Thomas Hoccleve and the Literature of Late Medieval England, Penn State Press, 2001 

Sebastian Sobecki (2019), Last Words: The Public Self and the Social Author, Oxford University Press , Chapter 2, 'The Series: Hoccleve's Year of Mourning', pp. 65–100.

References

External links

The International Hoccleve Society: Devoted to promoting scholarship on the late-medieval poet Thomas Hoccleve
The Hoccleve Archive: Resources for Scholars, Teachers, and Students interested in Thomas Hoccleve, his Works, and their Textual History
MS 1083/30 Regiment of princes; Consolation of philosophy at OPenn
 The Regiment of Princes,, edited by Charles R. Blyth. TEAMS, Middle English Text Series
Hoccleve's short poetry, edited by Frederick J. Furnivall and I. Gollancz based on his holograph manuscripts

1368 births
1426 deaths
Middle English poets
15th-century English writers
Medieval European scribes
English male poets
15th-century English poets